Lagrangian coherent structures (LCSs) are distinguished surfaces of trajectories in a dynamical system that exert a major influence on nearby trajectories over a time interval of interest. The type of this influence may vary, but it invariably creates a coherent trajectory pattern for which the underlying LCS serves as a theoretical centerpiece. In observations of tracer patterns in nature, one readily identifies coherent features, but it is often the underlying structure creating these features that is of interest.

As illustrated on the right, individual tracer trajectories forming coherent patterns are generally sensitive with respect to changes in their initial conditions and the system parameters. In contrast, the LCSs creating these trajectory patterns turn out to be robust and provide a simplified skeleton of the overall dynamics of the system. The robustness of this skeleton makes LCSs ideal tools for model validation, model comparison and benchmarking. LCSs can also be used for now-casting and even short-term forecasting of pattern evolution in complex dynamical systems.

Physical phenomena governed by LCSs include floating debris, oil spills, surface drifters and chlorophyll patterns in the ocean; clouds of volcanic ash and spores in the atmosphere; and coherent crowd patterns formed by humans and animals.

While LCSs generally exist in any dynamical system, their role in creating coherent patterns is perhaps most readily observable in fluid flows.

General definitions

Material surfaces 

On a phase space  and over a time interval  , consider a non-autonomous dynamical system defined through the flow map , mapping initial conditions  into their position  for any time .

is an invariant manifold in the extended phase space . Borrowing terminology from fluid dynamics, we refer to the evolving time slice  of the manifold  as a material surface (see Fig. 1). Since any choice of the initial condition set  yields an invariant manifold , invariant manifolds and their associated material surfaces are abundant and generally undistinguished in the extended phase space. Only few of them will act as cores of coherent trajectory patterns.

LCSs as exceptional material surfaces 

In order to create a coherent pattern, a material surface  should exert a sustained and consistent action on nearby trajectories throughout the time interval . Examples of such action are attraction, repulsion, or shear. In principle, any well-defined mathematical property qualifies that creates coherent patterns out of randomly selected nearby initial conditions.

Most such properties can be expressed by strict inequalities. In classical dynamical systems theory, invariant manifolds satisfying such an attraction property over infinite times are called attractors. They are not only special, but even locally unique in the phase space: no continuous family of attractors may exist.

In contrast, in dynamical systems defined over a finite time interval , strict inequalities do not define exceptional (i.e., locally unique) material surfaces. For instance, if a material surface  attracts all nearby trajectories over the time interval , then so will any sufficiently close other material surface.

Thus, attracting, repelling and shearing material surfaces are necessarily stacked on each other, i.e., occur in continuous families. This leads to the idea of seeking LCSs in finite-time dynamical systems as exceptional material surfaces that exhibit a coherence-inducing property more strongly than any of the neighboring material surfaces. Such LCSs, defined as extrema (or more generally, stationary surfaces) for a finite-time coherence property, will indeed serve as observed centerpieces of trajectory patterns. Examples of attracting, repelling and shearing LCSs are in a direct numerical simulation of 2D turbulence are shown in Fig.2a.

LCSs vs. classical invariant manifolds 
Classical invariant manifolds are invariant sets in the phase space  of an autonomous dynamical system. In contrast,
LCSs are only required to be invariant in the extended phase space. This means that even if the underlying dynamical system is autonomous, the LCSs of the system over the interval  will generally be time-dependent, acting as the evolving skeletons of observed coherent trajectory patterns. Figure 2b shows the difference between an attracting LCS and a classic unstable manifold of a saddle point, for evolving times, in an autonomous dynamical system.

Objectivity of LCSs 

Assume that the phase space of the underlying dynamical system is the material configuration space of a continuum, such as a fluid or a deformable body. For instance, for a dynamical system generated by an unsteady velocity field

the open set  of possible particle positions is a material configuration space. In this space, LCSs are material surfaces, formed by trajectories. Whether or not a material trajectory is contained in an LCS is a property that is independent of the choice of coordinates, and hence cannot depend of the observer. As a consequence, LCSs are subject to the basic objectivity (material frame-indifference) requirement of continuum mechanics. The objectivity of LCSs requires them to be invariant with respect to all possible observer changes, i.e., linear coordinate changes of the form

As a consequence, any self-consistent LCS definition or criterion should be expressible in terms of quantities that are frame-invariant. For instance, the strain rate  and the spin tensor  defined as

transform under Euclidean changes of frame into the quantities

While such quantities may effectively mark features of the instantaneous velocity field , the ability of these quantities to capture material mixing, transport, and coherence is limited and a priori unknown in any given frame. As an example, consider the linear unsteady fluid particle motion

which is an exact solution of the two-dimensional Navier–Stokes equations. The (frame-dependent) Okubo-Weiss criterion classifies the whole domain in this flow as elliptic (vortical) because  holds, with  referring to the Euclidean matrix norm. As seen in Fig. 3, however, trajectories grow exponentially along a rotating line and shrink exponentially along another rotating line. In material terms, therefore, the flow is hyperbolic (saddle-type) in any frame.

Since Newton’s equation for particle motion and the Navier–Stokes equations for fluid motion are well known to be frame-dependent, it might first seem counterintuitive to require frame-invariance for LCSs, which are composed of solutions of these frame-dependent equations. Recall, however, that the Newton and Navier–Stokes equations represent objective physical principles for material particle trajectories. As long as correctly transformed from one frame to the other, these equations generate physically the same material trajectories in the new frame. In fact, we decide how to transform the equations of motion from an -frame to a -frame through a coordinate change  precisely by upholding that trajectories are mapped into trajectories, i.e., by requiring  to hold for all times. Temporal differentiation of this identity and substitution into the original equation in the -frame then yields the transformed equation in the -frame. While this process adds new terms (inertial forces) to the equations of motion, these inertial terms arise precisely to ensure the invariance of material trajectories. Fully composed of material trajectories, LCSs remain invariant in the transformed equation of motion defined in the -frame of reference. Consequently, any self-consistent LCS definition or detection method must also be frame-invariant.

Hyperbolic LCSs 

Motivated by the above discussion, the simplest way to define an attracting LCS is by requiring it to be a locally strongest attracting material surface in the extended phase space  (see. Fig. 4) . Similarly, a repelling LCS can be defined as a locally strongest repelling material surface. Attracting and repelling LCSs together are usually referred to as hyperbolic LCSs, as they provide a finite-time generalization of the classic concept of normally hyperbolic invariant manifolds in dynamical systems.

Diagnostic approach: Finite-time Lyapunov exponent (FTLE) ridges 

The heuristic element here is that instead of constructing a highly repelling material surface, one simply seeks points of large particle separation. Such a separation may well be due to strong shear along the set of points so identified; this set is not at all guaranteed to exert any normal repulsion on nearby trajectories.

The growth of an infinitesimal perturbation  along a trajectory  is governed by the flow map gradient . This perturbation generally grows along the trajectory  into the perturbation vector . Then the maximum relative stretching of infinitesimal perturbations at the point  can be computed as

where  denotes the right Cauchy–Green strain tensor. As this relative stretching tends to grow rapidly, it is more convenient to work with its growth exponent , which is then precisely the finite-time Lyapunov exponent (FTLE)

Therefore, one expects hyperbolic LCSs to appear as codimension-one local maximizing surfaces (or ridges) of the FTLE field.
By applying the same argument in backward time,
we obtain that time  positions of attracting LCSs are marked by ridges of the backward FTLE field .

The classic way of computing Lyapunov exponents is solving a linear differential equation for the linearized flow map . A more expedient approach is to compute the FTLE field from a simple finite-difference approximation to the deformation gradient.
For example, in a three-dimenisonal flow, we launch a trajectory  from any element  of a grid of initial conditions. Using the coordinate representation  for the evolving trajectory , we approximate the gradient of the flow map as

with a small vector  pointing in the  coordinate direction. For two-dimensional flows, only the first  minor matrix of the above matrix is relevant.

Issues with inferring hyperbolic LCSs from FTLE ridges

FTLE ridges have proven to be a simple and efficient tool for the visualize hyperbolic LCSs in a number of physical problems, yielding intriguing images of initial positions of hyperbolic LCSs in different applications (see, e.g., Figs. 5a-b). However, FTLE ridges obtained over sliding time windows  do not form material surfaces. Thus, ridges of  under varying  cannot be used to define Lagrangian objects, such as hyperbolic LCSs. Nonetheless, evolving second-derivative FTLE ridges computed over sliding intervals of the form  have been identified by some authors broadly with LCSs. In support of this identification, it is also often argued that the material flux over such sliding-window FTLE ridges should necessarily be small.

The "FTLE ridge=LCS" identification, however, suffers form the following conceptual and mathematical problems:
 Second-derivative FTLE ridges are necessarily straight lines and hence do not exist in physical problems.
 FTLE ridges computed over sliding time windows  with a varying  are generally not Lagrangian and the flux through them is generally not small.
 In particular, a broadly referenced material flux formula for FTLE ridges is incorrect, even for straight FTLE ridges
 FTLE ridges mark hyperbolic LCS positions, but also highlight surfaces of high shear. A convoluted mixture of both types of surfaces often arises in applications (see Fig. 6 for an example).
 There are several other types LCSs (elliptic and parabolic) beyond the hyperbolic LCSs highlighted by FTLE ridges

Local variational approach: Shrink and stretch surfaces 
The local variational theory of hyperbolic LCSs builds on their original definition as strongest repelling or repelling material surfaces in the flow over the time interval . At an initial point  , let 
denote a unit normal to an initial material surface  (cf. Fig. 6). By the invariance of material lines, the tangent space  is mapped into the tangent space of 
by the linearized flow map .
Therefore, in addition to a normal component of length , the advected normal also develops a tangential component of length  (cf. Fig. 7).

If , then the evolving material surface  strictly repels nearby trajectories by the end of the time interval . Similarly, 
signals that  strictly attracts nearby trajectories along its normal directions. A repelling (attracting) LCS over the interval  can be defined as a material surface  whose net repulsion  is pointwise maximal (minimal) with respect to perturbations
of the initial normal vector field . As earlier, we refer to repelling and attracting LCSs collectively as hyperbolic LCSs.

Solving these local extremum principles for hyperbolic LCSs in two and three dimensions yields unit normal vector fields to which hyperbolic LCSs should everywhere be tangent. The existence of such normal surfaces also requires a Frobenius-type integrability condition in the three-dimensional case. All these results can be summarized as follows:

These starting points serve are initial positions of exceptional saddle-type trajectories in the flow. An example of the local variational computation of a repelling LCS is shown in FIg. 8. The computational algorithm is available in LCS Tool.

In 3D flows, instead of solving the Frobenius PDE (see table above) for hyperbolic LCSs, an easier approach is to construct intersections of hyperbolic LCSs with select 2D planes, and fit a surface numerically to a large number of such intersection curves. The intersection curve of a 2D repelling LCS surface with the plane  is normal to both  and to the unit normal  of the LCS. As a consequence, an intersection curve  satisfies the ODE

whose trajectories we refer to as reduced shrink lines. (Strictly speaking, this equation is not an ordinary differential equation, given that its right-hand side is not a vector field, but a direction field, which is generally not globally orientable). Determining such shrink lines in a smooth family of nearby  planes, then fitting a surface to the curve family so obtained yields a numerical approximation of a 2D repelling LCS.

Global variational approach: Shrink- and stretchlines as null-geodesics 

A general material surface experiences shear and strain in its deformation, both of which depend continuously on initial conditions by the continuity of the map .
The averaged strain and shear within a strip of -close material lines, therefore, typically show  variation within such a strip.
The two-dimensional geodesic theory of LCSs seeks exceptionally coherent locations where this general trend fails, resulting in an order of magnitude smaller variability in shear or strain than what is normally expected across an  strip. Specifically, the geodesic theory searches for LCSs as special material lines around which  material strips show no  variability either in the material-line
averaged shear (Shearless LCSs) or in the material-line averaged strain (Strainless or Elliptic LCSs). Such LCSs turn out to be null-geodesics of appropriate metric tensors defined by the deformation field—hence the name of this theory.

Shearless LCSs are found to be null-geodesics of a Lorentzian metric tensor  defined as

Such null-geodesics can be proven to be tensorlines of the Cauchy–Green strain tensor, i.e., are tangent to the direction field formed by the strain eigenvector fields . Specifically, repelling LCSs are trajectories of  starting from local maxima of the  eigenvalue field. Similarly, attracting LCSs are trajectories of  starting from local minims of the  eigenvalue field. This agrees with the conclusion of the local variational theory of LCSs. The geodesic approach, however, also sheds more light on the robustness of hyperbolic LCSs: hyperbolic LCSs only prevail as stationary curves of the averaged shear functional under variations that leave their endpoints fixed. This is to be contrasted with parabolic LCSs (see below), which are also shearless LCSs but prevail as stationary curves to the shear functional even under arbitrary variations. As a consequence, individual trajectories are objective, and statements about the coherent structures they form should also be objective.

A sample application is shown in Fig. 9, where the sudden appearance of a hyperbolic core (strongest attracting part of a stretchline) within the oil spill caused the notable Tiger-Tail instability in the shape of the oil spill.

Elliptic LCSs 

Elliptc LCSs are closed and nested material surfaces that act as building blocks of the Lagrangian equivalents of vortices, i.e., rotation-dominated regions of trajectories that generally traverse the phase space without substantial stretching or folding. They mimic the behavior of Kolmogorov–Arnold–Moser (KAM) tori that form elliptic regions in Hamiltonian systems. There coherence can be approached either through their homogeneous material rotation or through their homogeneous stretching properties.

Rotational coherence from the polar rotation angle (PRA) 

As a simplest approach to rotational coherence, one may define an elliptic LCS as a tubular material surface along which small material volumes complete the same net rotation over the time intervall  of interest.
A challenge in that in each material volume element, all individual material fibers (tangent vectors to trajectories) perform different rotations.

To obtain a well-defined bulk rotation for each material element, one may employ the unique left and right polar decompositions of the flow gradient in the form

where the proper orthogonal tensor  is called the rotation tensor and the symmetric, positive definite tensors  are called the left stretch tensor and right stretch tensor, respectively.

Since the Cauchy–Green strain tensor can be written as

In planar motions, this rotation is defined relative to the normal of the plane. In three dimensions, the rotation is defined relative to the axis defined by the eigenvector of  corresponding to its unit eigenvalue. In higher-dimensional flows, the rotation tensor cannot be viewed as a rotation about a single axis.

For two-dimensional flows, the PRA can be computed from the invariants of  using the formulas

which yield a four-quadrant version of the PRA via the formula

where  is the Levi-Civita symbol,  is the eigenvector corresponding to the unit eigenvector of the matrix .

The time  positions of elliptic LCSs are visualized as tubular level sets of the PRA distribution . In two-dimensions, therefore, (polar) elliptic LCSs are simply closed level curves of the PRA, which turn out to be objective. In three dimensions, (polar) elliptic LCSs are toroidal or cylindrical level surfaces of the PRA, which are, however, not objective and hence will generally change in rotating frames. Coherent Lagrangian vortex boundaries can be visualized as outermost members of nested families of elliptic LCSs. Two- and three-dimensional examples of elliptic LCS revealed by tubular level surfaces of the PRA are shown in Fig. 10a-b.

Rotational coherence from the Lagrangian-averaged vorticity deviation (LAVD) 

The level sets of the PRA are objective in two dimensions but not in three dimensions. An additional shortcoming of the polar rotation tensor is its dynamical inconsistency: polar rotations computed over adjacent sub-intervals of a total deformation do not sum up to the rotation computed for the full-time interval of the same deformation. For this reason, rotations predicted by the polar rotation tensor over varying time intervals divert from the experimentally observed mean material rotation of fluid elements.

An alternative to the classic polar decomposition provides a resolution to both the non-objectivity and the dynamic inconsistency issue. Specifically, the Dynamic Polar Decomposition (DPD) of the deformation gradient is also of the form

where the proper orthogonal tensor  is the dynamic rotation tensor and the non-singular tensors  are the left dynamic stretch tensor and right dynamic stretch tensor, respectively. Just as the classic polar decomposition, the DPD is valid in any finite dimension. Unlike the classic polar decomposition, however, the dynamic rotation and stretch tensors are obtained from solving linear differential equations, rather than from matrix manipulations. In particular,  is the deformation gradient of the purely rotational flow

.

The dynamic rotation tensor  can further be factorized into two deformation gradients: one for a spatially uniform (rigid-body) rotation, and one that deviates from this uniform rotation:

As a spatially independent rigid-body rotation, the proper orthogonal relative rotation tensor  is dynamically consistent, serving as the deformation gradient of the relative rotation flow

In contrast, the proper orthogonal mean rotation tensor  is the deformation gradient of the mean-rotation flow

The dynamic consistency of  implies that the total angle swept by  around its own axis of rotation is dynamically consistent. This intrinsic rotation angle  is also objective, and turns out to equal to one half of the Lagrangian-averaged vorticity deviation (LAVD). The LAVD is defined as the trajectory-averaged magnitude of the deviation of the vorticity from its spatial mean. With the vorticity  and its spatial mean

the LAVD over a time interval  therefore takes the form

with  denoting the (possibly time-varying) domain of definition of the velocity field . This result applies both in two- and three dimensions, and enables the computation of a well-defined, objective and dynamically consistent material rotation angle along any trajectory.

Outermost complex tubular level curves of the LAVD define initial positions of rotationally coherent material vortex boundaries in two-dimensional unsteady flows (see Fig. 11a). By construction, these boundaries may exhibit transverse filamentation, but any developing filament keeps rotating with the boundary, without global transverse departure form the material vortex. (Exceptions are inviscid flows where such a global departure of LAVD level surfaces from a vortex is possible as fluid elements preserve their material rotation rate for all times). Remarkably, centers of rotationally coherent vortices (defined by local maxima of the LAVD field) can be proven to be the observed centers of attraction or repulsion for finite-size (inertial) particle motion in geophysical flows (see Fig. 11b). In three-dimensional flows, tubular level surfaces of the LAVD define initial positions of two-dimensional eddy boundary surfaces (see Fig. 11c) that remain rotationally coherent over a time intcenter|erval  (see Fig. 11d).

Stretching-based coherence from a local variational approach: Shear surfaces 

The local variational theory of elliptic LCSs targets material surfaces that locally maximize material shear over the finite time interval  of interest. This means that at initial point each point  of an elliptic LCS , the tangent space  is the plane along which the local Lagrangian shear  is maximal (cf. Fig 7).

Introducing the two-dimensional shear vector field

and the three-dimensional shear normal vector field

the criteria for two- and three-dimensional elliptic LCSs can be summarized as follows:

For 3D flows, as in the case of hyperbolic LCSs, solving the Frobenius PDE can be avoided. Instead, one can construct intersections of a tubular elliptic LCS with select 2D planes, and fit a surface numerically to a large number of these intersection curves. Again, the intersection curves of elliptic LCSs with the plane  are normal to both  and to the unit normal  of the LCS. As a consequence, an intersection curve  satisfies the reduced shear ODE

whose trajectories we refer to as reduced shear lines. (Strictly speaking, the reduced shear ODE is not an ordinary differential equation, given that its right-hand side is not a vector field, but a direction field, which is generally not globally orientable). Determining such limit cycles in a smooth family of nearby  planes, then fitting a surface to the limit cycle family yields a numerical approximation for 2D shear surface. A three-dimensional example of this local variational computation of an elliptic LCS is shown in Fig. 11.

Stretching-based coherence from a global variational approach: lambda-lines 

As noted above under hyperbolic LCSs, a global variational approach has been developed in two dimensions to capture elliptic LCSs as closed stationary curves of the material-line-averaged Lagrangian strain functional. Such curves turn out to be closed null-geodesics of the generalized Green–Lagrange strain tensor family , where  is a positive parameter (Lagrange multiplier). The closed null-geodesics can be shown to coincide with limit cycles of the family of direction fields

Remarkably, they are initial positions of material lines that are infinitesimally uniformly stretching under the flow map . As an example, Fig. 13 shows elliptic LCSs identified as closed -lines within the Great Red Spot of Jupiter.

Parabolic LCSs 

Parabolic LCSs are shearless material surfaces that delineate cores of jet-type sets of trajectories. Such LCSs are characterized by both low stretching (because they are inside a non-stretching structure), but also by low shearing (because material shearing is minimal in jet cores).

Diagnostic approach: Finite-time Lyapunov exponents (FTLE) trenches 

Since both shearing and stretching are as low as possible along a parabolic LCS, one may seek initial positions of such material surfaces as trenches of the FTLE field . A geophysical example of a parabolic LCS (generalized jet core) revealed as a trench of the FTLE field is shown in Fig. 14a.

Global variational approach: Heteroclinic chains of null-geodesics 

In two dimensions, parabolic LCSs are also solutions of the global shearless variational principle described above for hyperbolic LCSs. As such, parabolic LCSs are composed of shrink lines and stretch lines that represent geodesics of the Lorentzian metric tensor . In contrast to hyperbolic LCSs, however, parabolic LCSs satisfy more robust boundary conditions: they remain stationary curves of the material-line-averaged shear functional even under variations to their endpoints. This explains the high degree of robustness and observability that jet cores exhibit in mixing. This is to be contrasted with the highly sensitive and fading footprint of hyperbolic LCSs away from strongly hyperbolic regions in diffusive tracer patterns.

Under variable endpoint boundary conditions, initial positions of parabolic LCSs turn out to be alternating chains of shrink lines and stretch lines that connect singularities of these line fields. Fig. 14b shows an example of parabolic LCSs in Jupiter's atmosphere, located using this variational theory. The chevron-type shapes forming out of circular material blobs positioned along the jet core is characteristic of tracer deformation near parabolic LCSs.

Software packages for LCS computations 

Particle advection and Finite-Time Lyapunov Exponent calculation:

 ManGen (source code)
 LCS MATLAB Kit (source code)
 FlowVC (source code)
 cuda_ftle (source code)
 CTRAJ
 Newman (source code)
 FlowTK (source code)

See also 
 Turbulence
 Chaos theory
 Dynamical systems theory
 Spectral submanifold

References

Further reading 

 
 

Dynamical systems
Fluid dynamics
Turbulence
Chaos theory
Flow visualization